Genesis Revisited: Live at the Royal Albert Hall is a live album by musician Steve Hackett. It was recorded at the Royal Albert Hall, London, during the second UK leg of a tour around the release of Genesis Revisited II. It features a full set from the show performed on 24 October 2013, including 18 Genesis songs. The box set features the full live show across two CDs and on one DVD, together with a further DVD containing two documentaries.

Track listing

Personnel
Band
Steve Hackett – guitar, vocals
Roger King – keyboards
Nad Sylvan – vocals, tambourine
Gary O'Toole – drums, percussion, vocals
Lee Pomeroy – bass, bass pedals, percussion, twelve-string guitar, vocals
Rob Townsend – saxophone, woodwind, percussion, vocals, keyboards

Special guests
Amanda Lehmann
John Wetton
Ray Wilson
Roine Stolt

Charts

References

External links
 Album announcement on HackettSongs
 European release on Discogs

2014 live albums
Steve Hackett albums
Inside Out Music live albums